Álvaro Cervantes Sorribas (born 12 September 1989) is a Spanish actor.

Life and career
Álvaro Cervantes Sorribas was born in Barcelona on 12 September 1989. His younger sister Ángela has also pursued an acting career.

Cervantes made a name for himself in television dramas. From 2015 to 2016, he starred as the protagonist Emperor Charles V in the historical drama television series Carlos, rey emperador.

He featured in the 2016 historical drama film 1898, Our Last Men in the Philippines, and in the 2017 television series La zona as a policeman.

Filmography
 Pretextos (2008) as Lucas
 El juego del ahorcado (2009) as David
 Tres metros sobre el cielo (2010) as Pollo
 Hanna (2011) as Feliciano
 Punta Escarlata (2011, TV series) as Marcos.
 Meublé La Casita Blanca (2011, TV Movie) as Mar
 El Sexo de los Ángeles (2012) as Rai
 Tengo ganas de ti (2012) as Pollo
 88 (2012) as Joel
 Luna, el misterio de Calenda (2012–2013, TV Series) as Joel
 El corazón del océano (2014)
 Hermanos (2014)
 Los nuestros (2015, TV Series) as Alonso
 Carlos, rey emperador (2015–2016, TV Series) as Carlos de Austria
  (2016, TV Series) as Dani
 1898, Los últimos de Filipinas (2016) as Soldado Carlos
 La zona (2017, TV Series) as Martín Garrido
 The Tree of Blood (2018) as Marc
 Bajo el mismo techo (2019) as Nacho
 Brigada Costa del Sol (2019, TV Series) as Leo Villa
 The Legacy of the Bones (2019) as Dr. Berasategui
 Adú (2020) as Mateo
 Offering to the Storm (2020) as Dr. Berasategui
 The devil's clocks (2020) as Aurelio Vizcaino
 Malnazidos (2020) as Mecha
 Crazy About Her (2021) as Adri
Donde caben dos (More the Merrier) (2021) as Raúl
 42 segundos (2022) as Manel Estiarte
 Love at First Kiss (2023)

References

External links 

 

1989 births
Living people
Male actors from Catalonia
21st-century Spanish male actors
Spanish male film actors
Spanish male television actors